The 2000–01 season was the 101st season in Società Sportiva Lazio's history and their 13th consecutive season in the top-flight of Italian football. Lazio were unable to defend their Serie A title won in 2000 after finishing third, but won the Supercoppa Italiana.

Summary
On 30 October manager Sven-Goran Eriksson was appointed by Football Association as its new England manager from July 2001. After his departure was announced, the team collapsed to the 4th spot. On 7 January 2001 Eriksson left the club and Cragnotti appointed Dino Zoff as its new manager.

Players

Goalkeepers
  Luca Marchegiani
  Paolo Orlandoni
  Angelo Peruzzi

Defenders
  Paolo Negro
  Daniel Ola
  Néstor Sensini
  Siniša Mihajlović
  Alessandro Nesta
  Giuseppe Pancaro
  Emanuele Pesaresi
  Guerino Gottardi
  Giuseppe Favalli
  Fernando Couto
  Maurizio Domizzi
  Francesco Colonnese

Midfielders
  Dino Baggio
  Karel Poborský
  Roberto Baronio
  Diego Simeone
  Pavel Nedvěd
  Dejan Stanković
  Attilio Lombardo
  Lucas Castromán
  Iván de la Peña
  Juan Sebastián Verón

Attackers
  Claudio López
  Marcelo Salas
  Hernán Crespo
  Simone Inzaghi
  Fabrizio Ravanelli

Transfers

Competitions

Serie A

League table

Results summary

Results by round

Matches

Coppa Italia

Round of 16

UEFA Champions League

Group stage

Second group stage

Supercoppa Italiana

Statistics

Players statistics

Goalscorers
  Hernán Crespo 26 (1)
  Pavel Nedvěd 9 
  Marcelo Salas 7 (1)
  Siniša Mihajlović 4 (2)
  Simone Inzaghi 4 (1)
  Juan Sebastián Verón 3

References

S.S. Lazio seasons
Lazio